Edwin Price (1846–1914) was a British Anglican priest, most notably the Archdeacon of Auckland from 1908 until his death.

Price was born in Warborough, educated at Clare College, Cambridge and ordained in 1871. After a curacy at St George the Martyr, Holborn he was a Minor Canon at Westminster Abbey from 1877 to 1890. He was Vicar of St Andrew with St Anne, Bishop Auckland from 1890 to 1903; and an Honorary Chaplain to the Queen from 1895 to 1901.

He died on 16 March 1914.

References

1846 births
Alumni of Clare College, Cambridge
Archdeacons of Auckland
1914 deaths
Honorary Chaplains to the Queen
People from Oxfordshire (before 1974)